The Glasgow and South Western Railway (GSWR) 131 class is a class of ten 0-4-2 steam locomotives designed in 1864. They were by Patrick Stirling's fifth 0-4-2 design for the railway.

Development 
The ten examples of this class were designed by Patrick Stirling for the GSWR and were built by R and W Hawthorn (Works Nos. 1222-31) in 1864. They were numbered 131–40. The members of the class were fitted with domeless boilers and safety valves over the firebox, these were later replaced by those of Ramsbottom design over the centre of the boiler following a boiler explosion at Springhill in 1876. The original weather boards were also replaced by Stirling cabs.

Eight of the class were rebuilt as 0-4-2 tank locomotives between 1880 and 1886.

Withdrawal 
The locomotives were withdrawn between 1883 and 1895.

References 
 

 

131
Scrapped locomotives
Standard gauge steam locomotives of Great Britain
Railway locomotives introduced in 1864
0-4-2 locomotives